The 1890 AHAC season was the fourth season of the Amateur Hockey Association of Canada. Play was in challenges. The Montreal Hockey Club would win the final challenge of the season against the Montreal Victorias to win the Canadian championship for the third season in a row.

League business 

The annual meeting of the Amateur Hockey Association was held in the rooms of the MAAA in Montreal, on November 22, 1889. The main business was whether to accept Quebec or not, and whether to change the Crystals team name to the Dominions. Representatives from most of the hockey clubs were present. The election for the ensuing year resulted as follows:

 President, Mr. J. Stewart (Montreal);
 first vice-president, H. Kinghorn (McGill);
 second vice-president, W.G Cameron (Victorias);
 secretary-treasurer, J.A Findlay (Montreal);
 Council — A.E McNaughton (Montreal), W.E Stevenson (Victoria), J. McDonald (Crystals), D.B. Holden (McGill), R. Davidson (Quebec).

Regular season 

The season consisted of challenge games as well as numerous exhibition matches between all the teams in the AHAC. Quebec would challenge this season. The Montreal Crystals would be known as the Dominion Hockey Club of Montreal for this season.

Overall record 
Statistics are based on challenge games only and do not include stats regarding exhibition games 

† National Champion

Schedule and results

Player statistics

Scoring leaders 
Note: GP = Games played, G = Goals scored.

No scorer identified for 1 Montreal and Victoria goal.

Goaltender averages 
Note: GP = Games played, GA = goals against, SO = Shutouts, GAA = Goals against average

References

Bibliography

Notes

Amateur Hockey Association of Canada seasons
AHAC